Arunava Chaudhuri (born 30 October 1976) is a German sports journalist, media analyst, television presenter, author and sports management professional of Indian descent, who served as both the COO of Indian Super League club Mumbai City during the inaugural edition in 2014 and media manager of the All India Football Federation (AIFF). Specialized in Indian football, he is co-founder and chief reporter of Rs1tv, a Remscheid-based German television channel. Chaudhuri's works are also part of the media library of NRWision.

He appeared as a football pundit on BBC Sport, NDTV, India Today, Zee Sports and other leading news broadcasters, alongside playing the role of strategic advisor of RoundGlass Sports. A leading football columnist in Sportskeeda, Chaudhuri authored segments of "RSSSF India" at the Rec.Sport.Soccer Statistics Foundation.

Career

indianfootball.com
He broke into the sports journalism in 1998 through launching indianfootball.com (archived version of 15 August 2000) and becoming its editor-in-chief, which was India's first website fully devoted to association football in the country. Emerged as the official website of the three England tours of the India national football team in 2000, 2001, and 2002, it was noted for having the information database about each and every nationwide football tournament in the country. Later in 2006, it gained popularity worldwide after achieving more than seven lakh single user hits mark. In 2008, the website portal entered into a global partnership with Zurich-based International Football Arena Ltd. (IFA).

Co-founder of Rs1tv
Chaudhuri is co-founder and editor-in-chief of German television channel Rs1tv, which was incorporated in Remscheid in December 2010.

Later years
Chaudhuri began his radio and television career with Deutsche Welle, and later appeared as sports journalist in Sky Sports, DAZN, ESPN-Star Sports, Frankfurter Allgemeine Zeitung, Hindustan Times, Times Now, Headlines Today, WION and others. Chaudhuri worked on a number of football projects across the world in management, as strategic advisor and as a consultant, for the Asian Football Confederation, German Football Association (DFB), German Bundesliga (DFL), FC Bayern Munich, Borussia Dortmund, Eintracht Frankfurt, 1899 Hoffenheim, Southampton FC. He also worked in football development in the Caribbean Football Union, the All India Football Federation, and with the Indian national football team. In 2011 during India national football team's Caribbean tour (known officially as +ONE India Caribbean Tour 2011), Chaudhuri became the team's media analyst.

Chaudhuri was instrumental in bringing Bayern Munich in India for the farewell match of Indian international Bhaichung Bhutia in Delhi, in January 2012, in which the German club won 4–0. He also became advisor of the German Football Academy in India.

COO of Mumbai City
Chaudhuri was appointed Chief operating officer of newly formed Indian Super League club Mumbai City in the inaugural edition of 2014. He joined the Mumbai-based club in June 2014, which is co-owned by Ranbir Kapoor and Bimal Parekh. He was instrumental in bringing players and coaching personnel ahead of the league season kickoff, including club's first marquee player Freddie Ljungberg from Sweden and German international Manuel Friedrich.

Indischer Kulturverein
Besides sports journalism, Chaudhuri is associated with numerous German-Indian charity organizations, and serves as the president of Indischer Kulturverein e.V., which is based in Cologne (Köln) and registered by the Consulate General of India in Frankfurt. It hosts continental Europe's biggest Durga Puja festival every year.

RoundGlass Sports
Chaudhuri was roped in as strategic and technical advisor of RoundGlass Sports in 2017 by owner Sunny Singh, to help and aid with formation of its football program. Later, the club's U-19 team clinched Hero Elite League title in February 2019.

Personal life
Born in Remscheid, Chaudhuri is of Indian Bengali background as his parents, both came from Kolkata, West Bengal, who migrated to Germany. At the age of ten, he moved to India and spent five-years of schooling in Calcutta International School. After coming back to Remscheid in 1992, he appeared in the Heinrich Heine University Düsseldorf and completed his graduation in English and Information Science.

Chaudhuri is supporter of both FC Remscheid and FC Bayern Munich.

Appearances
Reporter of Deutsche Welle – 2006 FIFA World Cup in Germany; 2011 AFC Asian Cup in Qatar
Co-host of International Football Arena: 2008, 2010
Codex – World's Top 50 Innovators (The Business of Football), London: 2009
 Host of the Star Sports Indian Football Forum: 2009, 2010, 2012, 2014, 2018, 2019
Host of the Football Players' Association of India (FPAI) – Indian Football Awards: 2010, 2013, 2014, 2017
Committee member of the "Asian Football Awards" (organization of British South Asians in association football; registered by the The Football Association): 2012
Speaker at the World Football Forum on Indian football, Paris: 2016
SPOBIS in CCD Congress Center Düsseldorf in Düsseldorf: 2018
 4th International Frankfurt Football Summit: 2018

Publications
Books
 (coauthored; alongside Milena Karanikolova, Robin Russell)

Articles
"Gender and sport in India: aspects of women's football" (archived 5 April 2005) — in (2005) ''The gendered kick: Women's soccer in twentieth century India, Soccer & Society", 6:2–3, 270–284, DOI: 10.1080/14660970500106469.

See also

Sports journalism

References

Further reading

Shamya Dasgupta (2005) Indian or otherwise: PIO footballers are just a couple of strikes away, Soccer & Society, 6:1, 34–48, DOI: 10.1080/1466097052000336990.

External links

1976 births
People from Remscheid
German sports journalists
German people of Indian descent
German people of Bengali descent
Sports journalists
Association football journalists
Living people